Seven Worlds, One Planet is a documentary series from the BBC Natural History Unit. The seven-part series, in which each episode focuses on one continent, debuted on 27 October 2019 and is narrated and presented by naturalist Sir David Attenborough. Over 1,500 people worked on the series, which was filmed over 1,794 days, with 92 shoots across 41 countries.

Music
Sia, Chris Braide and Hans Zimmer collaborated on the song "Out There" for the series. The original television soundtrack titled "Seven Worlds One Planet Suite" was made by Zimmer and Jacob Shea, while Shea wrote the series' score.

Episodes 

Viewing data sourced from BARB.

References

External links

 
 
 Seven Worlds, One Planet at BBC Earth

2010s British documentary television series
2019 British television series debuts
2019 British television series endings
BBC high definition shows
BBC television documentaries
BBC Television shows
David Attenborough
Documentary films about nature
English-language television shows
Television series by BBC Studios
Television shows scored by Hans Zimmer